Radio From Hell is an American radio program broadcast weekday mornings on Salt Lake City, Utah's KXRK 96.3FM, simulcast via a live internet audio stream, and available as an iTunes podcast or downloadable MP3. It can also be watched live on YouTube and the X96 website. The show features hosts Kerry Jackson, Bill Allred, and Gina Barberi.

Rolling Stone cited KXRK as one of the top-five rock and roll radio stations in the U.S., and reported that Radio From Hell was one of the longest-running local radio programs in the U.S.

History
The show originated on Ogden's KJQ as "The Fun Pigs", hosted by Jackson and Allred in 1986. It was later retitled to Radio From Hell for being "the radio show for people who feel like hell in the morning". Jackson and Allred were among five out of twenty-five employees who did not quit KJQ in December 1991.

Many members of the former KJQ staff founded a new station, KXRK, which premiered in February 1992. The new station featured Bill Allred and Dom Casual in a morning show called "Project X with Dom and Bill"; they were among many ex-KJQ personalities on the initial lineup on KXRK.

Kerry Jackson continued to host a morning show on KJQ, working briefly with several other hosts including Mo Mellady (who lasted less than a month) and Clyde Lewis, becoming KJQ program director in May, 1993. Jackson worked for a time on KZHT before joining KXRK on October 18, 1993, where he replaced Dom Casual in the mornings. Reunited, Jackson and Allred resumed calling their show "Radio From Hell."

On May 20, 1996, Gina Barberi joined the program. Barberi had been hosting a morning show on KUTQ called "Woody and Barberi" with co-host Scott Woodmansee; she had been working as a mid-day DJ at KUTQ before moving to this position. Gina had worked at KJQ in the late 1980s when she was 19 and still a student at the University of Utah.

Radio From Hell aired its 5000th episode in August 2008, and a 7500th episode celebration was being planned for September 2020. Unfortunately, due to the Coronavirus pandemic, this event did not happen.

The show is still on the air Monday through Friday 6:00 a.m. - 10:00 a.m. (MST)  As of December 2020, the hosts are each broadcasting from their own home set-ups (due to the Coronavirus pandemic) while their producer Caity continues to go into the studio.

As of July 5, 2021, the hosts returned to the studio and are no longer broadcasting from their home set-ups.

Basic Format
Radio From Hell (RFH) begins each morning at 5:00 A.M. Mountain Time. During the 5:00 A.M. hour, the previous day's 9:00 A.M - 10:00 A.M. segment of the previous show airs, interwoven with sound clips from various movies and television series. The live show runs from 6:00 A.M. and ends near 10:00 A.M.  During the Coronavirus pandemic of 2020, the hosts briefly extended the show an additional hour.

The hosts regularly relate humorous anecdotes about their families, friends, jobs, pets, eating habits, shopping trips, vacations and other experiences. The show incorporates several regular features and guests noted below.

Radio From Hell'''s hosts, especially Jackson and Allred, are known for being socially and politically liberal. They frequently discuss the LDS Church, Utah state liquor laws and many other idiosyncrasies of Utah life and culture.

Listeners are called "friends of the program" and the show currently has a fairly active live chat room attached to the live video feed with regular listeners.  Listeners can also text the show.  X96 is currently part of the Broadway Media group<

Mission statement
The show's mission statement is occasionally played before the show begins. Allred reads the announcement, with music in the background.

"It is our mission to embrace the idea that our show shall always strive to belittle the stupid and to play an occasional song. We shall also strive to take all of your requests, but to never, under any circumstances, play those requests. It is our mission to offend as many people as we can in the shortest time possible. We shall always remember that no matter how pointless and stupid the things we say are, we shall present them in such a way that they will be lessons that will last a lifetime. We shall strive always to do nothing and to be mean. We shall strive mightily to always be the number one morning show in Salt Lake or, if not that, the number two morning show or, at least somewhere in the top 15 or 20 morning shows. At least once a year we shall go to someone's home and we shall eat really good food and we'll make you wish that you could be there to share it with us. And finally, it is our mission to always remind the listeners that we never lie, and we're always right. So let it be written. So let it be done."

Hosts

Kerry Jackson
Kerry Jack Jackson grew up in Salem, Utah and graduated from Spanish Fork High School. He currently lives in Salt Lake City with his Korean-American wife, Sue. Jackson often references and discusses his love for geek culture including video games, comic books (Marvel Comics, not DC Comics), and science-fiction movies and television series such as Star Trek and Star Wars. One of his favorite video games is the Lego Star Wars series. His large toy collection consists of Batman, Star Trek, Star Wars, and Marvel Comics action figures . Kerry regularly plays audio clips from the Cartoon Network's Adult Swim lineup including Aqua Teen Hunger Force, Space Ghost Coast to Coast, Sealab 2021, Squidbillies, Saul of the Mole Men, and Tim and Eric Awesome Show, Great Job!.

For over a decade, Jackson has served as the host of "The Geek Show", which is now in podcast form called GeekShow Podcast.  It can be found on iTunes, Stitcher and its own website www.geekshowpodcast.com   His experience with GeekShow(as well as his status in the geek community in Salt Lake) has led him to being an important consultant for the programming segment of the Salt Lake FanX Convention.  Jackson has moderated or participated in panels since the con's inception, most notably Tom Holland in 2019.  Jackson currently serves on the FanX
Community Council 
Jackson often recounts his adventurous weekend experiences (usually involving his fondness for mixed drinks), offers humorous pickup lines, and occasionally performs impressions of celebrities including Larry Flynt, Roy Horn, Lou Ferrigno, and Owen Wilson.  Kerry has claimed that he has an innate talent for recreating the voices of handicapped celebrities. Kerry also does the voice of the character, "Frank Chryst", a celebrity-reporter (created by Brad Lee Mullen, aka Cuzzin Brad who passed in 2021) is perpetually grieving over the "horrible, terrible tragedy" of a recently publicized celebrity death.

Jackson also has been candid and jocular about his suffering from possibly a combination of personality disorders, such as obsessive compulsive disorder, depression and social anxiety. He says he lies in bed and hears songs or phrases repeat themselves over and over. Mostly these intrusive and repetitive thoughts are Warner Bros. themed. Also in early 2007, Bill was allowed to read an email from a listener that had seen Jackson shopping, who was noticeably irate and wrathful, due to being surrounded by too many people.  Jackson is also a survivor of testicular cancer and often makes jokes about how he now only has one real testicle.

Jackson had a bit part in the film The Singles Ward, but has disavowed his role in the film because he felt it was simply not funny. Despite his best efforts, however, he was offered a part in a proposed sequel. 

Jackson is also responsible for recording, selecting and playing the majority of the sound clips on the show; Allred has described Jackson as the Don Letts of Radio From Hell (referencing Lett's role in rock group Big Audio Dynamite).

Kerry attempted to participate in The World Series of Pop Culture. After traveling to California, his team, "Shatner's Midnight Runners" passed the written exam and were allowed to audition for the producers. They were ultimately cut from the contest and sent home with a calendar for their trouble.

Bill Allred
A native of Ogden, Utah, Allred was born Ralph William Allred. He attended Ben Lomond High School, then graduated from the theater program at Weber State University, and did some graduate work at Penn State University. Allred actually finished all of his coursework at Penn State University, but told his professors that he would mail in his Thesis for his Masters in Theatre art. The rough draft for that thesis is in a briefcase under his bed at this very moment. According to Allred, while at Penn State he was attacked by squirrels and, therefore, no longer cares for the small animals. Bill fell into radio work by accident, starting with an overnight shift. Allred tends to be the most intellectual of the three hosts, reading such magazines as The Economist, and frequently referring to "tuna salad" as "salad niçoise". He also enjoys biking, camping, hiking, and other outdoor activities. In 2012, he trekked from Kathmandu to base camp at Mount Everest (although he did not go to the summit) and provided several recorded updates of his trip for the show.

He currently lives in downtown Salt Lake City with his wife, "Mrs. Bill", his son "Little Bill", his daughter "Little Mrs. Bill", and his two cats, Mr. Fluffy Pants and Klaus. (His former cats G. Gordon Liddy and Rush Limbaugh have passed.) Bill is a fan of movies, having gone so far as to say that he would like to be able to see every movie that is released, even the really bad movies. Some of Bill's stories relate to raising his live-in family as well as a family from a previous marriage who still live in Ogden. He is often trying to discover educational outings for his intellectually curious son "Little Bill". One such trip led to a children's library and a tour of a giant colon model.  "Little Bill" has continued to grow and is now taller than his dad; Bill often talks about his obsession with Halloween, dressing up and gore make-up on the show.  In 2019, a running joke on the show involved "Little Bill's" fascination with a raccoon carcass which found and proceeded to learn how to mount for display.

Bill has spoken on air about his brother Noal, who died as a result of suicide on September 23, 2008. Allred stated on the September 22, 2011 broadcast of the Radio From Hell show, that he has some of his brother's ashes in a box in his basement. (Also, by coincidence, his wife's sister died on the same day, though not by suicide.) As a result, Bill is outspoken about suicide awareness and participates in the "Out of the Darkness" suicide walk in Salt Lake City each year.  Bill also shares anecdotes about his mother Nola, who died in 2013, and occasionally his father and step-father.  His sister owns a restaurant in Ogden called "Two-Bit Street Café" .

Bill regularly performs different voices and impressions during his reading of the news. The most popular include his German, Swedish, and Namibian accents. Also popular is his Strom Thurmond-like impression of Utah Legislator Chris Buttars and his bloviating reproduction of former U.S. Congressman Chris Cannon. In the past, Bill frequently appeared as William Shatner in order to wish friends of the program a "Happy Birthday", though appearance of this feature has become rare in recent years. In 2007, Bill performed the voice of Senator Larry Craig, the infamous Senator caught by police in a Minneapolis Airport bathroom stall for sex solicitation.

Allred was an extra in the Robert Altman movie Nashville. According to Bill, he is in a crowd scene and is distinguishable by his Budweiser shirt and sunglasses.  He is also the star of Trent Harris' film Delightful Water Universe.

Bill also currently hosts a podcast called "The Let's Go Eat Show" where he interviews local people of interest over a meal at a local restaurant.  As Bill is an admitted 'foodie', these restaurants are generally locally owned and often feature unusual or high-end cuisine.  Some weeks, Allred also interviews the chef, owner or other staff of the featured restaurant and releases this interview as a sort of mini-podcast.

Gina Barberi
Gina Marie Barberi grew up in Roy, Utah, the daughter of famed Utah radio show host Tom Barberi and her frequent foil of a mother, "The Sainted Mary Claire". She was remarried in February 2005 to Joe. Barberi has three children, Festus (a son from her first marriage to "the Pirate"), Jonesie  and Mohammad . Gina frequently expresses her fondness for celebrity news, gossip and rumor. To that end, she receives a Cosmo subscription for each Christmas from Allred. However, in May 2007, she stated that she had "seen and read" all the magazine had to offer and no longer desired the subscription. A good deal of Gina's personal life has been made public on the air, such as her experiments with thong underwear, her breast enlargement surgery, her 800 thread count Egyptian cotton sheets, her Hawaiian-based wedding, and her elementary school aged son's penchant for hard rockers AC/DC. Gina's son Festus has long told Gina that he wants to be a rock star, and as he has gotten older, has started performing with "The Departed".

Gina is a picky eater, refusing to eat such common staples as cheese, tomatoes, honey, or seafood due to her dislike of their texture. When ordering a hamburger from either the Crown Burgers or Training Table restaurants, she insists on only having meat and bread. No lettuce, tomatoes, onions, pickles, or condiments. Her husband "Joe" has attempted, largely unsuccessfully, to broaden Gina's culinary horizons.  Although, recently, they enacted a rule at the Jones household that there would be no special meals (not in Gina's case of course), but they're hoping to correct Festus and prevent Jonesie from being picky eaters.

Gina possesses several phobias, including wind chimes, shower curtains, sculptures depicting children, mountain lions, the wind, Chitty Chitty Bang Bang, and killer bees. (The first two have been explained by Gina's childhood exposure to horror movies.) In order to avoid being assaulted, Gina says she pretends to talk on the phone while walking through a parking lot, and if Joe is not home she will keep her cellular phone under her pillow, and turns on the TV (which cannot be visible from any window or someone might want to steal it) so it sounds as if people are talking if she is home alone.

Though Jackson and Allred will admit to occasionally exaggerating their own traits and behaviors for comedic effect, they insist that Barberi does not do so; her radio persona is not an act.

Recurring Features
Boner of the Day
One feature on the show, "Boner of the Day" (formerly "Boners in the News") is referred to as the "feature that won't go away." The term boner is now used to mean "a mistake", though the feature originally was called the "morning boner", and featured more sexual innuendo.

In its current incarnation, the feature presents three current event articles that display "bad, stupid, or funny human behavior". Bill re-titles and reads the three articles. After all three candidates are read, listeners to the program can call, text, or e-mail in their votes. The story which receives the most votes is then pitted against a second set of three stories. According to Allred, this   In order to be crowned "Boner of the Day". A local resident and entrepreneur, Dave "The Flower Guy" Matson enters the studio on Friday, towards the end of the show, to choose one of the daily winners as "Boner of the Week", In 2006, an attempt has been made to crown "Boner of the Month", "Boner of the Quarter", and "Boner of the Year" using online web polls.  This attempt did not succeed.

Controversy
In 2004, an advertising campaign for the show caused rumors that a same-sex marriage proposal was afoot in the area. "Rainbox billboards" featured the likeness of a typical, small-town Christian church in front of a rainbow, with the caption "Alternative Lifestyle? 'Til Death Do Us Part, " during an election season in which Utah voters were faced with the question of passing an anti-gay marriage amendment.

AwardsRadio From Hell has won the Salt Lake City Weekly's reader's-choice award for Best Radio Show every year since the category was introduced: 2002, 2003, 2004, 2005. 2006, 2007, 2008, 2009, 2010, 2011, 2012, 2013, 2014, 2015, 2016, 2017, 2018, 2019, and 2020.Radio From Hell is the longest-running radio morning show in the Salt Lake City, Utah area, in its 34th year as of 2020.Radio From Hell is the highest-rated radio show by 18- to 34-year-olds in the Salt Lake City market, according to Arbitron's Summer 2006 report.

In its 2006 summer double issue, Rolling Stone named KXRK (Radio From Hell'''s host station) as one of the top five rock stations in the country.

References

External links

Radio From Hell Homepage
Radio From Hell Daily Blog and Show Notes
KSL News article regarding the billboard controversy
Kyle Brown's website. The site also contains Punk's Movie Reviews
Punk's complete movie reviews
Bill Frost's Blog
Psychic Margaret Ruth's website
X96 Documentary
Radio From Hell Drinking Game
Geek Show Podcast Website

American variety radio programs
Mass media in Utah
Mass media in Salt Lake City